Gareth Davies (born 7 August 1973) is a Welsh physical education teacher, former professional rugby league footballer who played in the 1990s, and rugby union coach.

Background
Davies was born in Widnes.

Playing career

International honours
Gareth Davies won four caps for Wales, in June 1995 against the USA (2 matches), and while at Warrington in the 1996 European Rugby League Championship against France, and England.

Club career
Gareth Davies made his début for Warrington on Wednesday 20 September 1995, he played in 1996's Super League I, 1997's Super League II, and he played his last match for Warrington Sunday 6 April 1997.

References

External links
Statistics at wolvesplayers.thisiswarrington.co.uk 

1973 births
Living people
Rugby league centres
Rugby league fullbacks
Rugby league locks
Rugby league players from Cardiff
Rugby league second-rows
Wales national rugby league team players
Warrington Wolves players